Wellsford is a rural locality in the City of Greater Bendigo in the Australian state of Victoria.

References 

Bendigo
Towns in Victoria (Australia)
Suburbs of Bendigo